John "Foghorn" Jackson (21 May 1833 – 4 November 1901) was a Nottinghamshire and All-England Eleven cricketer who was generally reckoned to be the outstanding fast bowler of the 1850s.

Born in Bungay in Suffolk, Jackson was affectionately known as "Foghorn". He was a powerful, if inconsistent bat and an occasional wicketkeeper, but he was best known as a right-arm fast bowler of fearsome pace and ability. Haygarth stated that his career, 'though rather short, must be considered most brilliant.' He was the first cricketer to appear in a cartoon in Punch.

He played for Nottinghamshire from 1855 to 1866 and also represented Kent in 1858. In 1859, he took part in the first ever overseas cricket tour when he was a member of the England team visiting North America. He also toured Australia and New Zealand in 1863–64.

His overall first-class career record covered 115 matches.  He scored 1993 runs at an average of 12.61 with a highest score of 100.  He took 106 catches. Jackson took 655 wickets for 7491 runs at 11.52, taking 100 wickets in 1858 and 1860.  His best innings analysis was 9/27 and he took 5 wickets in an innings on 59 occasions and 10 wickets in a match 20 times. He was only 33 when he dropped out of County cricket and latterly appeared for local sides against the All England Eleven.

Jackson lived his later life in extreme poverty despite the County awarding a benefit of £300 in 1874. He died at Brownlow Hill, a Liverpool workhouse.

References

External links
 
 John Jackson at CricketArchive

Further reading
 H. S. Altham, A History of Cricket, Volume 1 (to 1914), George Allen & Unwin, 1926
 Derek Birley, A Social History of English Cricket, Aurum, 1999
 Rowland Bowen, Cricket: A History of its Growth and Development, Eyre & Spottiswoode, 1970
 Arthur Haygarth, Scores & Biographies, Volumes 3–9 (1841–1866), Lillywhite, 1862–1867
 John Major, More Than A Game, HarperCollins, 2007 – includes the famous 1859 touring team photo taken on board ship at Liverpool
 Peter Wynne-Thomas The History of Nottinghamshire CCC, Helm 1992

1833 births
1901 deaths
English cricketers
English cricketers of 1826 to 1863
People from Bungay
All-England Eleven cricketers
Kent cricketers
Nottinghamshire cricketers
Players cricketers
North v South cricketers